Lee (Hindi: ली) is a small village located in Pauri Tehsil of Pauri Garhwal district (Pin Code : 246001, STD Code: 01368), Uttarakhand India.

Even in 2022 there is no road system in this village, the government officials are very corrupt here.

Demographics 
In the 2011 Census of India, Lee had a population of 148 people in 33 families.

 Literacy rate : 79.34% compared to 78.82% of Uttarakhand.
 Male Literacy rate : 98.18% .
 Female Literacy rate : 63.64% .

Average Sex Ratio of Lee village is 1000 which is higher than Uttarakhand state average of 963. Child Sex Ratio for the Lee as per census is 421, lower than Uttarakhand average of 890.

Other Details 
As per constitution of India and Panchyati Raaj Act, Lee village is administrated by Sarpanch (Head of Village) who is elected by the people of the village with voting rights. Devprayag is nearest town to Lee which is approximately 6.5 km away.

References 

Villages in Pauri Garhwal district